Brown v Raindle (1796) 30 ER 998 is an English land law case, concerning co-ownership of land. It confirmed that equity will not, in copyhold land for example, generally allow a widow the right to remain in a property where a mortgage remains in arrears.

Facts
This was a standard repossession action. The legal question arose as to enforcing repossession against a widow — would it have to wait as with the rights of the lord of the manor in the custom of that manor, under the copyhold system, until her demise.

As such a bill was filed for foreclosure, and to compel a surrender of a copyhold estate for three lives, under a covenant in the mortgage deed of 1792 (to surrender those premises as an additional security). Did a covenant of the mortgagor bar the right of his widow "to free-bench"? The custom of the manor appeared by the evidence to be, that the copyholder could convey these estates by surrender; but where he dies seised of the estate, the widow "is entitled to the estate during her widowhood as her free-bench".

Judgment
Sir RP Arden said the following in his judgment.

See also

English trusts law
English land law
English property law

References

1796 in England
1796 in case law
English trusts case law
English land case law
1796 in British law
Foreclosure